José Javier Conde Pujana (born 14 July 1964) is a paralympic athlete from Spain competing mainly in category T46 long-distance events.

Javier has competed in five Paralympics winning a total of seven gold and two silver medals.  His first games were in front of his home crowd in Barcelona at the 1992 Summer Paralympics where he won gold in each of his four events, 800m, 1500m, 5000m and 10000m.  He added a further two gold medals in Atlanta in 1996 in the 5000m and marathon but missed out on a medal in the 1500m.  In 2000 he fell a little short of defending both titles when Robert De Friese Evans ran a world record to beat him in the 5000m but did defend his marathon gold.  2004 saw him compete in just the 5000m gaining his second consecutive silver medal in the event.  His fifth games in Beijing in 2008 Summer Paralympics were the first time he failed to medal after finishing eleventh in the marathon.

Notes

References

External links
 
 
 

1964 births
Living people
Paralympic athletes of Spain
Paralympic gold medalists for Spain
Paralympic silver medalists for Spain
Paralympic medalists in athletics (track and field)
Athletes (track and field) at the 1992 Summer Paralympics
Athletes (track and field) at the 1996 Summer Paralympics
Athletes (track and field) at the 2000 Summer Paralympics
Athletes (track and field) at the 2004 Summer Paralympics
Medalists at the 1992 Summer Paralympics
Medalists at the 1996 Summer Paralympics
Medalists at the 2000 Summer Paralympics
Medalists at the 2004 Summer Paralympics
Spanish male middle-distance runners
Spanish male long-distance runners
Spanish male marathon runners
Middle-distance runners with limb difference
Long-distance runners with limb difference
Marathon runners with limb difference
Paralympic middle-distance runners
Paralympic long-distance runners
Paralympic marathon runners
20th-century Spanish people
21st-century Spanish people